Uraechoides taomeiae is a species of beetle in the family Cerambycidae. It was described by Masao Hayashi, Nara and Yu in 1995. It is known from Taiwan.

References

Lamiini
Beetles described in 1995